The 2005 Ohio State Buckeyes football team represented Ohio State University in the 2005 NCAA Division I-A football season.  The team's head football coach was Jim Tressel.  The Buckeyes played their home games in Ohio Stadium. The team finished the season with a win–loss record of 10–2, and a Big Ten Conference record of 7–1. They tied for the Big Ten championship with Penn State.

In 2005, A. J. Hawk was the sixth Ohio State player to receive the Lombardi Award.  He was also voted OSU's season MVP for this year and was All-American.  All year, Troy Smith and Justin Zwick competed for the spot of starting quarterback.

Early in the season, they played their first ever meeting against the Texas Longhorns of The University of Texas, which they lost, 25–22.

To conclude the season, they made an appearance in the 2006 Fiesta Bowl and defeated the Notre Dame Fighting Irish 34–20.  They finished the season ranked No. 4 in the nation.

Schedule

Roster

Coaching staff
 Jim Tressel – Head Coach (5th year)
 Tim Beckman – Defensive Cornerbacks (1st year)
 Jim Bollman – Offensive Line/OC (5th year)
 Joe Daniels – Quarterbacks / Passing Game Coordinator (5th year)
 Luke Fickell – Co-Defensive Coordinator / Linebackers (4th year)
 Paul Haynes – Defensive Safeties (1st year)
 Darrell Hazell – Assistant Head Coach / Wide Receivers (2nd year)
 Jim Heacock – Defensive Coordinator / Defensive line (10th year)
 John Peterson – Offensive Tight Ends / Recruiting Coordinator (2nd year)
 Dick Tressel – Running Backs (5th year)
 Bob Tucker - Director of Football Operations (11th year)
 Stan Jefferson - Director of Player Development (2nd year)
 Butch Reynolds - Speed Coordinator (1st year)

Game summaries

Miami University

    

Justin Zwick would start at quarterback due to Troy's Smith's suspension the previous year.

Texas

    
    
    
    
    
    
    
    
    
    
    
    

Justin Zwick would start and then give way to Troy Smith, who would start at quarterback the rest of the year, in a matchup of the #2 vs #4 teams that year.

San Diego State

Iowa

Ohio State came into the contest looking to avenge the previous year's 33–7 loss to Iowa.

Penn State

Michigan State

Indiana

Minnesota

Illinois

Northwestern

Michigan

Source: ESPN

Fiesta Bowl

Rankings

Awards and honors
A. J. Hawk, Lombardi Award

2006 NFL draftees

References

Ohio State
Ohio State Buckeyes football seasons
Big Ten Conference football champion seasons
Fiesta Bowl champion seasons
Ohio State Buckeyes football